William Kenneth ("Kenny") Watson (born 21 May 1955 in Port Elizabeth) is a South African former first-class cricketer active 1974–92 who played for Border and Nottinghamshire. Watson played in 143 first-class and 147 List A matches during his career.

References

1955 births
Living people
South African cricketers
Border cricketers
Eastern Province cricketers
Northerns cricketers
Nottinghamshire cricketers